Have You Been Paying Attention? (abbreviated on social media as HYBPA? NZ and stylised on-screen as Have you been paying attention? in sentence case) is a New Zealand panel show on TVNZ 2, based on the original Australian series Have You Been Paying Attention?. The series is a mix of news and comedy in which host Hayley Sproull quizzes five guests – permanent panelists Urzila Carlson and Vaughan Smith and three others – on the week's top news stories.

Format
The series sees the host ask guests a range of news-related questions. In turn, guests give humorous or satirical answers. Correct answers are awarded points. In addition to questions regarding the previous week's events, the contestants are also quizzed in various other games. Some segments are partly presented by guest hosts as part of cross-promotion.

While the show declares a winner each episode, there is no prize, and the show records segments declaring each panelist a winner in case the edit changes the scores given in the final broadcast show. Speaking about the Australian version of HYBPA, on which she also appears, Carlson said "it’s for laughs not really to win the game, although I like to win!"

History 
The series debuted on 24 July 2019. On 23 and 30 October, repeat episodes were aired, as the TVNZ studio had been evacuated due to the New Zealand International Convention Centre fire nearby.

Production for the series was put on hold as a result of the COVID-19 pandemic in March 2020. The series resumed on 29 April via remote work and videotelephony by all of the comedians. Filming returned to the studio on 20 May, after lockdown restrictions were reduced.

The second series debuted on 16 February 2021. On 20 August, a repeat episode was aired due to New Zealand returning to lockdown. The series resumed on 27 August using video conferencing.

Episodes
<onlyinclude>

Note: Winners are listed in bold

Season 1 (2019-20)

Season 2 (2021)

Season 3 (2022)

A third series of Have You Been Paying Attention? launches Friday 5 August 2022 on TVNZ2.

Cast

Hosts
Hayley Sproull
Pax Assadi (1 episode)

Guests

Controversy 
The 20 May 2020 episode was pulled from TVNZ OnDemand over a segment where the panellist Urzila Carlson was asked if "Hipango" was the name of a member of parliament or a brand of yoghurt. Whanganui MP Harete Hipango said that the segment insulted her family, saying that "my adult children who carry my whanau name Hipango have paid attention and like their mother are not amused at the poor taste humour of a Sth Africa NZ kiwi (sic) so-called 'comedienne' bastardising our family/whanau name on national television in order to generate a few half-hearted laughs". TVNZ apologised, and removed the episode from OnDemand while it spoke with Hipango.

References

External links
 

TVNZ 2 original programming
New Zealand game shows
Panel games
2019 New Zealand television series debuts
English-language television shows
Television shows set in Auckland
2020s New Zealand television series
New Zealand television series based on Australian television series